Towne East Square is an enclosed, two-story shopping mall located in the eastern section of Wichita, Kansas, United States.

Overview
The anchor stores are Dillard's, Round One Entertainment, JCPenney, and Von Maur. There is 1 vacant anchor store that was once Sears. In Summer 2019, a Round One Entertainment complex started construction in the former J.M. McDonald/Service Merchandise/Stein Mart/Steve & Barry's/New Mattress Hub/Wright Career College/Glow Golf space. It was later confirmed that the Round One Entertainment Complex was slated to open in 2020. It was intended to open on July 1, 2020, but due to the COVID-19 pandemic, the store officially opened on July 18, 2020. On December 28, 2018, it was announced that Sears would be closing as part of a plan to close 80 stores nationwide. The store closed in March 2019.

The area around the mall was changed heavily in recent years as several businesses and hotels were demolished for the expansion and addition of a flyover on Highways 54/400 (Locally signed Kellogg). Simon has purchased much of the vacated land for redevelopment.

History
The mall was first planned in 1972 as Kellogg Mall, but was later changed into Towne East Square, Construction began in 1973, and officially opened On August 14, 1975 and was the first large, modern, multi-level enclosed mall in Wichita. The original Anchors were JCPenney, Dillard's, Henry's, Sears (which opened soon after the mall opened), and J.M. McDonald.

J.M. McDonald Liquidated in 1983 as Part of Parent company Wickles filing for Bankruptcy, and was replaced by Service Merchandise around 1985.

In 1992, Henry's closed, and sat abandoned for a while. It stayed abandoned until 2000, when It was demolished for Von Maur, which would later open in 2002. Meanwhile, Service Merchandise closed in 1998 due to low sales, and was taken up by Stein Mart in 1999.

Stein Mart had financial troubles, and closed in 2002. The store was later bought by Steve & Barry's around the Mid 2000s, and liquidated in Late 2008, following Steve and Barry's bankruptcy. In Late 2008, Towne East Square received a renovation to give it a more of an upscale look, including escalator movements. During the summer of 2009, Mattress Hub expanded their store at the mall into the former Steve and Barry's space, and moved in mid-2010 for Wright Career College that opened in 2011.

Wright Career College Later went bankrupt on April 16, 2016, and Glow Golf Later replaced Wright Career College on April 29, 2017, after moving from Reflection Ridge Plaza at the west side of Wichita. In 2018, Sears announced they would be closing 80 stores, including this one, which would close in March 2019. Glow Golf Wichita then announced on Facebook that they would be closing due to mall management forcing Glow Golf to close most likely due to Low attendance at the attraction. Round1 later took up the space on July 18, 2020, complete with a tenant expansion causing four other businesses at the mall to move somewhere else in order to accommodate the Tenant expansion.

Scheels was confirmed on July 14, 2021, to Replace Sears. The store will open On May 31, 2023.

On December 14, 2021, it was announced that Towne East Square would get a Major overhaul both Inside and outside of the Mall. This overhaul will include The entrances getting wood and glass details and new signage, outdoor seating areas will be added and the parking lots and entryways will get new landscaping. The parking lot also will be repaved. The mall's second level will get updated flooring.

On March 18, 2022, at around 5:30 PM a shooting happened inside the Towne East Square close of the Round 1 establishment. There was one death of a 14-year old kid. Police captured two suspects one aged 16 and the other 17. This all stemmed from an argument between the teenagers when eventually one of them pulled out a firearm and fired it five to six times.

References

External links
Official Website

Shopping malls in Kansas
Simon Property Group
Buildings and structures in Wichita, Kansas
Tourist attractions in Wichita, Kansas
Shopping malls established in 1975
1975 establishments in Kansas